Hormogastridae is a family of annelids belonging to the order Haplotaxida.

Genera

Genera:
 Ailoscolex Bouché, 1969 
 Boucheona Marchán, Fernández, Díaz Cosín & Novo, 2018 
 Hemigastrodrilus Bouché, 1970

References

Annelids